North-West was a constituency of the European Parliament in Ireland in from 2004 to 2014. It elected 3 Members of the European Parliament (MEPs) using the single transferable vote form of proportional representation (PR-STV).

History and boundaries
The constituency was created in 2004 and was a successor to the Connacht–Ulster constituency. For 2004 election, County Clare was moved from the Munster constituency to the new North-West constituency. For the 2009 election the counties of Longford and Westmeath were transferred from the East constituency to North-West.

From 2009 it comprised the counties of Cavan, Clare, Donegal, Galway, Leitrim, Longford, Mayo, Monaghan, Roscommon, Sligo and Westmeath; and the city of Galway.

For the 2014 European Parliament election the constituency was abolished. All of its area became part of the new Midlands–North-West constituency; with the exception of County Clare which was transferred to the South constituency.

MEPs

Elections

2009 election

2004 election

See also
European Parliament constituencies in the Republic of Ireland

References

External links
 North-West MEPs – European Parliament Office in Ireland

European Parliament constituencies in the Republic of Ireland (historic)
2004 establishments in Ireland
Constituencies established in 2004
2014 disestablishments in Ireland
Constituencies disestablished in 2014